Latvia competed at the 1936 Summer Olympics in Berlin, Germany. 29 competitors, all men, took part in 16 events in 6 sports. It would be the last time that Latvia would compete at the Summer Games as an independent nation until the 1992 Summer Olympics.  After the nation was occupied by the Soviet Union in 1940, Latvian athletes were forced to compete at the Olympic Games as part of the USSR delegations.

Medalists

Athletics

Men
Track & road events

Field events

Combined events – Decathlon

Basketball

Second round
Winners advanced to the third round. Losers competed in the second consolation round for another chance to move on.

Second consolation round
Winners returned to the main competition for the third round. Losers were out of the tournament.

Cycling

Four male cyclists represented Latvia in 1936

Road

Shooting

Three shooters represented Latvia in 1936.
Men

Wrestling

Men's Greco-Roman

Art competitions

References

Nations at the 1936 Summer Olympics
1936
1936 in Latvian sport